The 2022 UConn Huskies baseball team represented the University of Connecticut in the 2022 NCAA Division I baseball season.  The Huskies played their home games at Elliot Ballpark on campus in Storrs, Connecticut.  The team was coached by Jim Penders, in his 19th season at UConn.  They played as members of the Big East Conference.

The Huskies won the Big East Regular Season and Tournament titles for the second year in a row.  They were invited to the 2022 NCAA Division I baseball tournament where they won the College Park Regional and surpassed the 2010 Huskies for most wins in program history.  They were defeated two games to one by second overall seed Stanford in the Stanford Super Regional, ending their season.

Previous season
The Huskies compiled a 34–19 record, 13–4 in the Big East, finishing in first place and winning the Big East Tournament.  They finished with a record of 1–2 in the NCAA South Bend Regional.

Personnel

Roster

Coaches

Schedule

Big East tournament

Ranking movements

References

UConn
UConn
UConn Huskies baseball seasons
Big East Conference baseball champion seasons
UConn